Zarlik and Munglik (German: Zảrlik und Munglik; Uzbek: Zorlik va Munglik) is an Uzbek folktale collected by Uzbek folklorist Mansur Afzalov and translated into German by Isidor Levin and Ilse Laude-Cirtautas. It is related to the theme of the calumniated wife and is classified in the international Aarne-Thompson-Uther Index as ATU 707, "The Three Golden Children".

Summary
A padishah has four wives, but has not fathered any child yet. One day, the youngest wife, named Gulbahra ("Rose-Beautiful") announces she is pregnant. The padishah rejoices in this fact. Gulbahra gives birth to twins, a boy and a girl. The other-cowives, however, see this as a threat to their position and bribe a sorceress named Mastan Kampir to get the children and replace them for puppies.

The sorceress takes the children and abandons them in the woods, hoping that the wild animals will devour the twins. Against her expectations, the children are nursed by a wild deer as their foster mother. Years later, a hunter kills the deer and the twins are all alone in the world. They are found by an old man, who named the boy Zarlik ("Der Kummervolle") and the girl Munglik ("Die Traurige").

The boy becomes a mighty and fine hunter and one day encounters his father, the padishah. The padishah admires the boy and wishes he could have such a son. He goes back to his palace and the co-wives learn of the twins survival. To get rid of the children for good, they order Mastan Kampir to cook up some trick. So Mastan Kampir visits the twins' house and tells Munglik about a Weltenspiegel ("A World-Mirror"), so she can see the whole world.

Munglik tells Zarlik about the World-Mirror and goes on a quest. With the help of the Semurgh bird, he brings home the mirror. One day, Munglik peers into the mirror, and discovers their father is the padishah, and their mother is buried in a hole in the ground, joined with two hounds. The twins invite the padishah to peer into the mirror, and he discovers the twins are his children. He punishes the three co-wives and the sorceress, and restores Gulbahra as his queen.

Analysis

Tale type
The tale is classified in the international Aarne-Thompson-Uther Index as type ATU 707, "The Three Golden Children".

According to folklorist , the tale type is "widespread" in Turkic-Mongolian traditions. Similarly, scholars Isidore Levin and Ilse Laude-Cirtautas noted the tale is spread in Turkic traditions, and also known as an homonymous Kazakh/Kyrgyz epic. In that regard, Turkish scholarshíp noted that the Kyrgyz epic Muňluk ve Zarlık shares motifs and plot structure with tales from Turkey, so much so it has been suggested they originate from a common cultural background of the Turkic peoples.

Motifs 

According to Erika Taube, these tales show variation in the number of the khan's wives (none, at first, or 1, 2, 3, 12 and even 108); the number of children (a son, two sons, a son and daughter pair, or three sons), and their attributes (golden chest, silver backside, or legs of gold or silver).

Variants

Uzbekistan
Similarities have been noted between tale type 707 and the Uzbek tale "Хасан и Зухра" ("Hasan and Zuhra"). In this tale, despite being married to 40 wives, the shah still hasn't fathered a son. In his wanderings, he finds three sisters, daughters of a shepherd, talking among themselves: Nasiba, Gulbahor and Sulfiya. The youngest, Sulfiya, promises to give birth to twins, a boy named Hasan and a girl named Zuhra, both beautiful and smart. The midwife replaces them with two goats, puts the twins in a bag and abandons it on the road. Thankfully, they are saved by a coming caravan. Twelve years pass, and Hasan, now a youth, meets his father, the shah, during a hunt. The shah convenes with a wise old woman, who discusses with the monarch the truth of what happened to his twin children.

In the Uzbek tale titled "Блестящая глиняная чаша" ("A Shining Pottery Bowl"), a tsar has 40 wives, but no son yet. His viziers suggest he take another wife. He marries another maiden. One day, she announces she is expecting a son. The other 40 wives feel threatened by the newcomer and bribe the midwife to get rid of the child as soon as they are born. The 41st wife gives birth to a pair of twins, a boy and a girl. The midwife takes the royal children, replaces them for puppies and abandons both in the wilderness to die. The youngest queen is banished to the steppe with the puppies, while her children are raised by a she-bear in a cave. Years later, the tsar's co-wives learn of their survival and order the midwife to get rid of them. The midwife visits them and sets them on a quest for a shining pottery bowl and a magic mirror. To get the second item, the boy saves a nest of Simurgh birdlings and takes a journey to another kingdom on its back.

In the tale "Золотая косичка" ("The Golden-Braided [Boy]"), a padishah and his viziers sight a giant red rose, where three peri women are weaving. The peris are asked about their abilities, the youngest promises to bear the padishah a golden-braided boy. The padishah marries the third peri woman, and the viziers the other two. The padishah's other co-wives bribe a midwife to get rid of the boy and replace him for puppies. The midwife throws the boy into the steppe, but he is found and suckled by a hart. The boy returns to his father's palace and the co-wives take the boy, lock him up in a chest and cast him in the sea. He survives this second attempt and is found by a fisherman. Years later, the co-wives and the midwife send the boy for a flower gulikakhkakh, forty magical cauldrons and a magic mirror.

Researcher Gabrielle Keller published an Uzbek tale, first collected in 1999 in Bulungur, Samarqand, from informant Qumri Abdimuminova. In this tale, titled Die goldhaarigen Zwillingskinder ("The Twin Children with Golden Hair"), a padeschah named Odil Chan is 43 years old, but has no children. One day, on a hunt, he approaches a house where a man lived with his three daughters, and overhears their conversation: the eldest promises to weave a carpet like no one has ever had; the middle one that she can build castles like the people never had, and the youngest promises to give birth to a golden-haired son. Odil Chan marries the youngest sister as his fourth wife, and she gives birth to twins, a boy and a girl. The padeschah's other wives become jealous and order a maidservant to get puppies, place the animals in the newborns' cradles to deceive him, and abandon the twins in the steppe. The maidservant bribes a wood gatherer to kill the children and bring back a cloth with their blood, but, out of pity, the wood-gatherer hides the children behind a bush and presents a cloth with dove's blood as proof of his deed. Some time later, the old man returns to check on the children and see a castle where he left them. He tries to bypass the castle, and enter a garden. He sees the twins, frolicking naked in the garden and eating the apples. The female twin calls out for her brother to see the old man, who promises to take them to city and clothe them. After the twins go to the city, the padescha Odil Chan begins to uncover the truth, and punishes his other wives.

Karakalpak people
Following professor 's study on Pushkin's verse fairy tale, The Tale of Tsar Saltan, Turkologist  argues that the dastan (a type of Central Asian oral epic poetry) titled Šaryar, from the Turkic Karakalpaks, is "closely related" to the tale type of the Calumniated Wife, and more specifically to The Tale of Tsar Saltan. In a version of the epos published by Russian translator , a ruler named Darapshah has nine wives, but no child. One day, he marries a beautiful maiden named Gulshara, and she bears him a pair of twins of "extraordinary beauty" named Sharyar and Anzhim. However, while king Darapshah is away, the nine co-wives bribe a sorceress to drown the children in a pond and replace them for a puppy and a kitten. Darapshah returns and sees the little animals. Tricked by the co-wives' deception, he banishes Gulshara away from the kingdom. As for the babies, they survive in the pond, until a slave hired by the co-wives takes them out, but, moved by their beauty, abandons them near a crossroads, until a kingly caravan finds the twins. The siblings are adopted by Khan Shasuar and his wife Akdaulet, and grow up as fine people: Sharyar a strong warrior and Anzhim a smart and well-read woman. The co-wives learn of the twins' survival and order the sorceress to get rid of them. The old witch pays a visit to Sharyar in his newly-built fortress and tells him about a fabulous city called Takhta-Zarin (Тахта-Зарин, in the original), where he can find a magical bird Bulbilgoya (Бюльбильгоя, in the original), which can sing beautifully and whose blood can heal the king, and about a maiden of peerless beauty named Khundyzsha (Хундызша, in the original). Sharyar rides his horse to Khundyzsha's city and marries her, then goes looking for the bird in the city of Takhta-Zarin, despite the maiden's protests. He reaches Takhta-Zarin and meets Bulbilgoya, which is a sorcerous bird that turns him to stone after a battle. Later, Anzhim senses something happened to her brother and follows his tracks to save him.

Kyrgysztan
In a Kyrgyz tale translated to Hungarian as A kán fia ("The children of the khan"), a khan has 40 other wives, but marries a maiden he meets in his travels who promises to give birth to twins, a boy and a girl with golden chest and silver back. They are born, replaced by puppies and adopted by a man named Akmat. Years later, the male twin searches for a white apple tree that always bears fruit, a talking parrot and a woman of great beauty named Kulanda.

Kazakhstan
Kazakh literary critic and folklorist  stated that type 707 is among the 15 tale types of the international index that are present in both Kazakhstan and elsewhere. Type 707 is reported to register 8 or 9 variants, and Kaskabasov supposes that, apart from tale "Алтын Айдар" ("Altyn Aidar"), at least 6 variants derive from qissa (ru) (Kazakh oral epic poetry) "Мунлык-Зарлык" ("Munlyk-Zarlyk").

In the Kazakh epic Muńlıq-Zarlıq, the king of Nogai land, Şanşar, is 60 years old and has 60 wives, but still has not fathered a child. One day, a figure called Hazrat Khidr appears to him in a dream and tells him to marry a girl who shall bear him twins, a boy and a girl. King Şanşar finds this girl: Qanşayim, daughter of fisherman Jaudır. The king marries Qanşayim and she bears him a boy and a girl, who are replaced for puppies and cast in the "Qazar Sea" by a witch named Mıstan Kempir. King Şanşar believes in the co-wives' trickery and banishes his wife and the dogs to a desert island. A person named Gayp Eren rescues the twins and names them Muńlıq (the girl) and Zarlıq (the boy), and lets them live with a deer as their milkmother. Zarlıq becomes a fine warrior, while Muńlıq is a talented young lady. The co-wives, however, learn of their survival, and send Mıstan Kempir to get rid of them. The witch convices Muńlıq to send her twin to Külmes, the khan of the Kalmyk. The boy ends up fighting the Kalmyk army and marrying the khan's daughter, princess Quralay. Meanwhile, on the island, Qanşayim has a dream where she is told her children are alive and well. Back to the king Şanşar, he follows a deer of golden and silver fur during a hunt, which is actually a benevolent spirit that is trying to reunite father and son. On the hunt for the same deer is Zarlıq, who meets up with his father. This leads Şanşar to release Qanşayim and punish the witch.

In a Kazakh tale, "Три сестры" ("Three Sisters"), a prince, the khan's son, is looking for a bride, when he stops by a tent, where he hears three womanly voices talking about their marriage wishes: the oldest sister says she will weave a golden carpet for his throne; the middle, that she will cook a feast for everyone with only an egg, and he youngest that she will bear the khan's son a boy with golden head and a girl with silver head. The prince decides to marry all three women, the first two accomplishing their promised feats. When it is time for the youngest queen to bear the fabled twins, her elder sisters convince a witch to throw the twins in the sea as soon as they are born and to replace them for animals. It just so happens and the twins are cast in a box that is saved by a poor old couple. They raise the twins and name the boy Kudaibergen ("given by God") and the girl Kunslu ("solar beauty"). Twelve years pass, the old man dies. The boy finds a powerful horse and begins to hunt, when he meets the king during a hunt. The sisters notice and send the witch to convince Kunslu to send her brother on dangerous quests: to get a self-playing dombra, a mirror that can see the whole "white world", and to seek Toshilar's daughter, Aislu ("lunar beauty") as his zhenge (the older brother's wife in the Kazakh familial system). Kudaibergen is advised by a helpful witch named Zhalmauyz Kempir, who, in regards to the second object (the mirror), tells the youth to seek the aid of the bird Samruk. When the boy tries to court Tolishar's daughter, her father shouts a magic spell to slowly petrify the youth. The prince, now khan himself, after seeing in the mirror his wife, tending to two dogs in the desert, orders his viziers to bring her back and learns of the whole plot.

In the Kazakh tale titled "Алтын Айдар" ("Altyn Aidar"), a khan has two wives. Before he leaves on a journey, he asks what his two wives will give him when he returns: the elder co-wife boasts she can build him a palace, while the younger promises to bear him a son and a daughter with a golden "aidar". The khan tells the younger co-wife to name the boy Altyn Aidar, and leaves. Both co-wives fulfill their promises, but the elder bribes a sorceress to take the children and drop them down a well, while placing a puppy and a kitten in their cradle. The khan returns and, seeing the animals, banishes the younger co-wife. Meanwhile, an eagle rescues the twins from the well and takes them to an old woman, who raises them. After the woman dies, Altyn Aidar begins hunting, while his sister stays in a cave. The elder co-wife learns of their survival and sends the sorceress to get rid of them. She convinces the female twin to send her brother to the pastures of Khan Kelmes, who owns a wild mare that foals colts that become tulpars. Altyr Aidar sails a boat to go to Khan Kelmes's lands, but a peri appears in the sea and tries to drown him by controlling the waves. The youth grabs her golden ring and she loses her powers, then reaches the pastures, where he holds a vigil on the herd for someone that is stealing Khan Kelmes's colts: another peri. Altyn Aidar threatens the second peri with a saber and gains a colt in return. Later, the sorceress goes back to the female twin and tells her her brother can find her a golden chest. Altyn Aidar rides his horse and meets an old woman near a fissure on the ground. The old woman tells him that many batyrs have come for the chest, but enter underground and become stones. Despite the danger, Altyn Aidar enters underground, but a third peri appears and petrifies him. His horse returns to the twins' cave; the female twin realizes her brother is in danger and rides the horse to the same place where the old woman is. She tells the old woman she will find her brother, and the peri, out of pity, restores her brother. Altyn Aidar returns home with his sister. Some time later, he walks in the woods and finds a yurt, where two peris are talking to each other about a youth who stole one's ring and the other's colts, but whom they wish to marry. Altyn Aidar appears to the peris and says he is the youth, taking them as his wives. At the end of the tale, the khan and Altyn Aidar meet during a hunt; a beast appears and reveals them the whole truth.

Tajikistan
In a Tajik tale translated into Hungarian as A beszélö pagagáj ("The Talking Parrot"), the padishah marries the youngest sister, who promised to give birth to a boy and a girl with hair bright like fire, faces bright as the sun and with a beauty mark on their brow. The padishah's other three wives bribe an old nurse to dispose of the children. The old nurse, however, takes them to a shepherd to raise. Years later, they are sent on a quest for a magical mirror that can see the whole world and a talking parrot.

Russian linguist  collected a variant in the Parya language from kolhoznik Ašur Kamolov in 1961, in Hissar district. In his tale, a padishah with two wives goes in search of a third one. He meets three women talking: the daughter of the vizir, the daughter of the bey and the daughter of the shepherd. The daughter of the shepherd says that she will bear a boy and a girl "as have never existed in the (whole) world". They marry. After the birth of the twins, they are replaced by the other co-wives by puppies and abandoned in the steppes, but a gazelle nurses the babies. Years later, they are sent for a talking nightingale.

In a tale collected in Dushanbe and translated into Russian as "Непризнанный царевич" ("The Unidentified Prince"), a poor old man that gathers brushwood lives with a wife and son. One day, he catches a large fish and finds a golden ring inside which he sells for a large sum of money. Some time later, he finds a large box in the river, with a woman and a beautiful baby inside. The old man takes them in. The tale then flashbacks to explains that the woman in the box was one of the wives of a local king, whose other co-wives tried to get rid of by bribing some servants to kill her. The servants did spare her, but cast her and her baby in the river. Back to present time, the woman's boy grows up a fine youth and decides to find work in the royal palace. His mother also goes with him and works there serving tea. Due to her beauty, the king falls in love with her and marries - unaware she was one of his previous wives. The co-queens, threatened by the boy's presence in court, try to get rid of him by sending him after some miraculous objects: first, after the "Каменную Воду" ("Stone Water"); then, for the "Разноцветную Воду" ("the multicoloured water"), and lastly for the "Вьющееся Дерево" ("the twisting tree"). With the help of a peri, the boy flies to Mount Kof and obtains the items. At the end of the tale, the boy's mother reveals to the king the boy is his own son, and that she was slandered by the co-wives. The king orders the co-queens' execution and reinstates the fallen queen to his side.

Tuva
Russian ethnologist Grigory Potanin recorded a variant from Uryankhay Krai, modern day Tuva, with the title "Мынг хонгор атту Тюмендей и его сынъ Ерь Сару". In the first part of the tale, a being named Tyumendey, under the guise of a Dzhelbag, forces an old man to surrender his three daughters in exchange for his freedom. The old man and his wife convince the girls to fetch fruits in the woods. They return to the yurt and see Dzhelbag. The girls escape by using objects to create magical obstacles to their pursuer. They meet a beaver near a river that carries them across the water. The beaver tells the girl to toss some stones in the river; Dzhelbag drowns. The animal advises them to climb up three fir trees and wait there. In the second part of the story, as the three sisters are sitting on treetops and playing musical instruments, three hunters pass by the trees when water pours down on them. Thinking it rain, they look up and see the maidens. The three sisters marry the three hunters. One day, the third hunter goes away with his brothers-in-law, and asks his wife what she will do for him when he gets back: she will bear a boy with silver neck and golden head. Her sisters become envious, replace the boy for an animal and throw him in the lake. The hunter returns and, seeing the animal, maims, blinds and abandons his wife. The woman regains her limbs and sight by use of a magical herb. She then prepares to rescue her son from the lake. She tries three times, and is successful on the third occasion. She feeds the boy her milk and rubs her tears on his eyes. He recognizes him as his mother and calls himself Er-Saru (Ер-сару).

Folklorist Erika Taube collected another Tuvan tale from a 69-year-old informant in 1969. In this tale, titled "Он ийи гадынныг хаан" or "Хан с двенадцатью женами" (The Khan with Twelve Wives), a khan has 12 wives, but laments that none has given birth to any son. He goes on a journey and finds at first a woman, which he thinks is ugly. He returns to his travels and finds three sisters talking inside a hut, the youngest wishing for a husband that has looked for her, travelled all over the world and suffered all travails. He marries the third sister and she gives birth to twin boys. The other co-wives replace the boys for animals and cast them in the water. The khan returns and, seeing the animals, banishes the thirteenth wife to an island. The boys are found by a childless couple. Years later, the khan sends his eagle to the skies and, when it does not return, he rides on his horse to the island and meets a deep-wrinkled old lady. The old lady says she is a "lady or ruler of fate" and sets the khan on a quest to redeem himself and restore his family. Taube argued that the old lady character as the ruler of fate was "an ancient element" present in this tale, and compared it to similar motifs and figures of Central Asian faiths.

Tofalar people
In a tale from the Tofalars titled "Три мальчика" ("Three Boys"), an old god wanders the Earth and seeks a woman to marry. He finds three women and inquires about their skills: the first tells she can bake bread for 300 people and there will still be some bread left; the second that she can plant 99 aspens to make skis for the people, and the third that she can bear three sons, the first two will have golden chest and the third a normal human chest. The god marries the third woman and has to go on a hunt. His wife gives birth to a boy with golden chest, who is replaced for a puppy by an evil midwife. The next year, the same happens to her second son. On the third year, she gives birth to a normal human boy, and the god, seeing that his wife failed in her promise, orders her and the son to be sewn inside a cow's hide and thrown in the sea. The cow's hide lands on an island. Mother and son live in the island, and the woman sews the boy a nice hat. The boy gives his hat to a man on the island and gains an ax, an iron stick and a bag. He reads in a book about a rich man who lives with two sons with golden chest. He recognizes that the boys are his elder brothers and goes to save them.

See also 
 The Golden-Haired Children (Turkish folktale)

References

Bibliography 
 Gümüş, Şule (2022). "“Muňluk ve Zarlık” destanıyla “Çember Has Güzel” ve “Üç Bacı” masallarındaki benzerlikler". In: Uluslararası Türkçe Edebiyat Kültür Eğitim Dergisi, 11 (2): 644-656. http://dx.doi.org/10.7884/teke.5454 (In Turkish)

Female characters in fairy tales
Fictional kings
Fictional queens
Twins in fiction
Fictional twins
Child abandonment
Adoption forms and related practices
Adoption, fostering, orphan care and displacement
ATU 700-749